The 1996 Salem Open Beijing and the Nokia Open were tennis tournaments. The men's tournament was played on indoor carpet courts while the women's tournament was played on indoor hard courts. Both events were held in Beijing, China and were part of the World Series of the 1996 ATP Tour and of Tier IV of the 1996 WTA Tour. The men's tournament was held from October 7 through October 13, 1996, while the women's tournament was held from October 14 through October 20, 1996. Greg Rusedski and Wang Shi-ting won the singles titles.

Finals

Men's singles

 Greg Rusedski defeated  Martin Damm 7–6(7–5), 6–4
 It was Rusedski's 2nd title of the year and the 5th of his career.

Women's singles

 Wang Shi-ting defeated  Chen Li-Ling 6–3, 6–4
 It was Wang's 2nd title of the year and the 6th of her career.

Men's doubles

 Martin Damm /  Andrei Olhovskiy defeated  Patrik Kühnen /  Gary Muller 6–4, 7–5
 It was Damm's only title of the year and the 8th of his career. It was Olhovskiy's 4th title of the year and the 14th of his career.

Women's doubles

 Naoko Kijimuta /  Miho Saeki defeated  Yuko Hosoki /  Kazue Takuma 7–5, 6–4
 It was Kijimuta's 2nd title of the year and the 2nd of her career. It was Saeki's 1st title of the year and the 2nd of her career.

External links
 Official website 
 Official website 
 ATP Tournament Profile
 WTA Tournament Profile

Salem Open Beijing
Nokia Open
China Open (tennis)
1996 in Chinese tennis